Arturo de la Rosa Escalante (born 4 May 1971) is a Mexican politician affiliated with the PAN. He currently serves as Deputy of the LXII Legislature of the Mexican Congress representing Baja California Sur. He subsequently served as municipal president of Los Cabos.

References

1971 births
Living people
Politicians from Baja California Sur
Members of the Chamber of Deputies (Mexico)
National Action Party (Mexico) politicians
21st-century Mexican politicians
People from Comondú Municipality
Members of the Congress of Baja California Sur
Municipal presidents in Baja California Sur